Babel is a 2019 South Korean television series starring Park Si-hoo and Jang Hee-jin. The series aired on TV Chosun from January 27 to March 24, 2019 on Saturdays and Sundays at 22:50 (KST) time slot.

Synopsis
The story of a prosecutor who would do anything to achieve his revenge and an actress who loses everything after marrying into a rich family.

Cast

Main
 Park Si-hoo as Cha Woo-Hyuk, former newspaper reporter now working as a prosecutor 
 Jang Hee-jin as Han Jeong-won, former actress married to Tae Min-ho

Supporting
 Kim Hae-sook as Sin Hyeon-sook, wife of Tae Byeong-cheo
 Jang Shin-young as Tae Yoo-ra, daughter of Tae Byeong-cheo and younger sister of Tae Soo-ho, Cha Woo-Hyuk's boss at prosecutor's office whom she also has a crush on
 Kim Ji-hoon as Tae Min-ho, youngest son of Tae Byeong-cheo, designated successor to head Geosan
 Song Jae-hee as Tae Soo-ho, oldest son of Tae Byeong-cheo
 Im Jung-eun as Na Yeong-eun, daughter of the owner of the newspaper company, wife of Tae Soo-ho
 Kim Jong-goo as Tae Byeong-cheo, chairman of chaebol Geosan
 Lee Seung-hyung as Sin Hyeon-cheol, younger cousin and co-conspirator of Sin Hyeon-sook, director of Geosan
 Song Won-geun as Secretary Woo, personal assistant to Tae min-ho
 Ha Si-eun as Hong Mi-seon, who runs a Spanish restaurant, best friends with Han Jeong-won
 Yoon Bong-gil as Detective Lee
 Lee Jae-gu as Ricky
 Park Joo-hyung as Go Jae-il, newspaper reporter who was a colleague of Cha Woo-Hyuk, boyfriend of Hong Mi-seon
 Yoon Jin-ho as Jang Bae-yoon
 Kyung Sung-hwan as Kwon Byeon, lawyer and mentee of Tae Yoo-ra
 Ri Min as Gook Gwa-soo
 Kim Jin-ho as Chief prosecutor

Production
The first script reading took place on November 20, 2018 at TV Chosun Broadcasting Station in Sangam, South Korea.

Original soundtrack

Part 1

Part 2

Part 3

Part 4

Ratings

References

External links
  
 
 

Korean-language television shows
2019 South Korean television series debuts
2019 South Korean television series endings
Television series about revenge
South Korean melodrama television series
TV Chosun television dramas